The United States Senate election of 1930 in Massachusetts was held on November 4, 1930. Incumbent Republican Senator Frederick H. Gillett did not run for re-election. In the open race to succeed him, Democratic Mayor of Fitchburg Marcus A. Coolidge defeated former U.S. Senator William M. Butler.

Republican primary

Candidates
 William M. Butler, former interim United States Senator (1924–1926)
 Eben S. Draper Jr., former State Senator from Hopedale, son of Governor Eben Draper, and candidate for Senate in 1928
 Andrew J. Gillis, Mayor of Newburyport

Withdrew
Alvan T. Fuller, former Governor of Massachusetts (1925–1929)

Declined
Calvin Coolidge, former President of the United States (1923–1929) and Governor of Massachusetts (1919–1921)
 Frederick Gillett, incumbent Senator since 1925

Campaign
Citing old age, Senator Frederick Gillett announced his retirement in December 1929. Alvan Fuller and Calvin Coolidge were speculated as potential candidates, and Eben S. Draper Jr. announced his plans to run for the open seat.

Alvan Fuller announced his intention to run on February 18, in response to a call by Joseph Simon, chairman of the Salem Republican Committee. Fuller entered on the heels of his opposition to any pre-primary convention, accusing the Republican State Committee of being a "corrupt outfit" which was headed for defeat in November. He also declared his opposition to Republicans William Scott Vare and Hiram Bingham III, who had both been censured by the Senate.

Former Senator William Morgan Butler was made his campaign formal on March 13, running as an unreserved "bone-dry" supporter of prohibition.

In March, the divide between Butler and Draper over the prohibition of alcohol took shape. Draper announced his unequivocal opposition to prohibition, including the repeal of the Eighteenth Amendment to the United States Constitution, on March 26. Butler soon criticized Draper for changing his position and failing to uphold the Constitution. As the campaign went on, Butler de-emphasized his position on prohibition, instead focusing on his support for business in the wake of the 1929 stock market crash.

In the campaign's final week, Constance Williams, the daughter of the late Senator Henry Cabot Lodge, accused Butler of politically abusing her late father in his final years. After Butler publicly claimed to have been friendly with Senator Lodge and declared himself Lodge's ideal successor, Williams publicly denounced Butler's candidacy and claimed Butler held a long grudge against her father stemming from his defeat of Butler's preferred candidate, William W. Crapo, in the 1893 Senate election.

Results

 

Despite the late attack against him and the general sentiment for prohibition repeal in the state, Butler narrowly defeated Draper by just under 6,600 votes.

Draper got a much smaller than expected margin in the cities, winning Boston by only 200 votes. Draper's loss was also attributed to the spoiler effect, with Newburyport mayor Andrew Gillis pulling 20,000 wet votes away.

Democratic primary

Candidates
 Marcus A. Coolidge, former Mayor of Fitchburg
 Eugene Foss, former Governor of Massachusetts and U.S. Representative
 Peter J. Joyce, manufacturer
 Thomas C. O'Brien, former Suffolk County District Attorney
 Joseph F. O'Connell, former U.S. Representative from Boston

Withdrew
 Roland D. Sawyer, State Representative from Ware and Congregationalist minister

Campaign
Roland D. Sawyer entered the race as a wet candidate on March 25. The next two candidates to formally announce, Marcus A. Coolidge and Joseph F. O'Connell, joined the campaign on May 11. Coolidge ran as a wet, while O'Connell said he would announce his platform at a later date, expressing confidence that Democrats would carry the state in November. 

Coolidge faced some difficulty winning over the party's Catholic base; he was a Protestant who had supported William Gibbs McAdoo over Al Smith for President in 1924, though he had actively campaigned for Smith in 1928. Coolidge overcame this deficiency by tying his campaign to that of the aging Irish Catholic icon John F. Fitzgerald for Governor, but he suffered a major setback when Fitzgerald withdrew due to illness. The paper Coolidge-Fitzgerald ticket was buoyed when Boston mayor James Michael Curley declared that Fitzgerald's Protestant opponent was anti-Irish.

Results

General election

Candidates
 William M. Butler, former United States Senator (Republican)
 Marcus A. Coolidge, former Mayor of Fitchburg (Democratic)
 Oscar Kinsalas, candidate for Secretary of the Commonwealth in 1928 (Socialist Workers)
 Max Lerner, candidate for Massachusetts Attorney General in 1928 (Communist)
 Sylvester J. McBride, perennial candidate (Socialist)

Results

See also 
 United States Senate elections, 1930 and 1931

References

Massachusetts
1930
1930 Massachusetts elections